The Berndt Museum of Anthropology is an anthropological museum in Perth, Western Australia, founded in  by Ronald Berndt and Catherine Berndt. The Berndt Museum is currently located with the Lawrence Wilson Art Gallery on the western side of the University of Western Australia's Crawley campus.

Housing 12,000 objects and 35,000 photographs, the museum contains one of the finest collections of Indigenous Australian art and cultural artifacts in the world, according to the Collections Australia Network (CAN). The collection consists of contemporary and historical Aboriginal Australian material culture from regions such as Arnhem Land, the Kimberley, Pilbara, the South West and the Western Desert. The museum also houses substantial Asian and Papua New Guinean collections.

History 
The Berndt Museum at the University of Western Australia holds one of Australia's finest and most important collections of Aboriginal cultural material and knowledge, manifesting in art, objects, archives, film, sound and photographs. The significance of the collection is renowned nationally and internationally, but its strength lies most in the inherent value to Aboriginal people and communities of origin and creation. The diversity of regions represented in the Berndt Museum holdings extends beyond Australia to Melanesia and southeast Asia; reaching as far as China, India, Japan and Egypt, firmly locating UWA and the state of Western Australia within the Asia-Pacific region.

The Museum was founded by Professor Ronald and Dr Catherine Berndt who came to Perth in 1956 to develop teaching and research in anthropology at UWA, bringing with them a large collection of material acquired during their field work in various areas of Australia and Papua New Guinea. This original collection was formally gifted to the university which, in 1976, established the Anthropology Research Museum to house it and several other collections transferred from UWA's Anthropology department. The museum's official launch and exhibits opened on 22 February 1979, showcasing collections from northeast and western Arnhem Land, the Kimberley, southwest South Australia, central Western Australia and the Western Desert.

In 1992, two years after Ronald Berndt's death, the Anthropology Research Museum was renamed the Berndt Museum of Anthropology in honour of Ronald and Catherine's contribution to the university, the field of anthropology and the Museum. Catherine's death in 1994 resulted in another generous bequest to UWA and the Museum. It contained the remainder of their private collections, including a significant Asian collection, the Ronald and Catherine Berndt Field Notebooks (under embargo until 2024) and the RM and CH Berndt Personal Archive of manuscripts, personal and professional papers.

Collections 
The Berndt Museum holds a range of collections of national significance. This includes more than 11,500 items, 35,000 photographs, film and sound and multiple archives, and is considered to be one of the most significant collections of Aboriginal and Torres Strait Islander art and cultural material globally. The collections include Asian and Melanesian material, as well as representations from across the world that broaden its international appeal.

History 
The Museum's history spans some 60 years of collecting with well over 100 years of historical and contemporary material that has continued to be supported, and with continued additions being made to existing donations by researchers locally, nationally and internationally. The Museum collections provide a means of encouraging the exchange of knowledge and igniting much-needed dialogue regarding culture, place, politics, law, identity and heritage.

Yirrkala Drawing Collection – UNESCO Memory of the World Register 
The Yirrkala Drawings were first collected and documented by renowned anthropologists, Catherine and Ronald Berndt. Catherine and Ronald worked with the Yolngu Community in 1946 and 1947 and, when it was believed that bark paintings with original designs would not survive local conditions and travel from a remote wetland setting to an urban one, rolls of brown paper and packets of crayons were called on to execute the designs in another medium. Yolngu from several clan groups were involved in creating the coloured crayon on brown paper drawings, many of which were inspired by land-based and interrelated designs evident on traditional bark paintings. The drawings produced by significant artists such as Mawalan and Wandjuk Marika, Munggurrawuy Yunupingu, Narritjin Maymuru and Wonggu Mununggurr are among the 365 works currently held in the Berndt Museum's Collection. In 2009, the Yirrkala Drawings Collection was successfully nominated for inclusion on UNESCO's Memory of the World Australian Register.

Photographic 
The Berndt Photographic Material Collection (BPMC) consists of negatives in various formats and digital images that are diverse in provenance and subject matter. Although a significant number of researchers and academics make use of the photographic material, this collection is of particular importance to Aboriginal community members as a visual point of reference in making connections to family, place and culture.

Returning Photos Project 
The Berndt Museum of Anthropology will act as point of contact for public requests for access to the photographic material compiled by the 'Returning Photos: Australian Aboriginal Photographs in European Collections' project. The project, funded by the Australian Research Council under its Discovery scheme (DP110100278), collated and presents information about historical photographs of Australian Aboriginal people held in four European Museums: the University of Oxford's Pitt Rivers Museum, the Cambridge University Museum of Archaeology and Anthropology, the Musee du Quai Branly in Paris, and the Nationaal Museum van Wereldculturen (National Museum of World Cultures) in Leiden.

Archives 
The Berndt Museum Archive contains a number of discrete collections documenting Australian Aboriginal knowledge, law and culture, socio-economic and political life, histories and interactions.

The Ronald M and Catherine H Berndt Field Notebooks and Personal Archive are currently subject to a 30-year embargo that will lift in 2024.

Exhibitions 
The Berndt Museum of Anthropology holds two major exhibitions annually, as well as associated public events. The changing program of exhibitions take place throughout the academic year and are held in the Janet Holmes à Court Gallery within the gallery.

Major exhibition listing 
 Out of the boxes and into the Desert. 13 July – 7 December 2019 – Out of the boxes and into the Desert explores the Berndt Museum of Anthropology's collection of paintings from the Central Desert. Following on from a recent storage project, the Berndt Museum seeks to provide access to works of art that have been inaccessible for decades. 
 ''Carrolup Revisited: A Journey through the South West of Western Australia. 9 February – 29 June 2019 – Carrolup Revisited: A Journey through the South West of Western Australia celebrates the artists well known for their role in the Carrolup School of Art.
 Stockyards and Saddles: A story of Gibb River Station. 21 July – 8 December 2018 – Stockyards and Saddles: A Story of Gibb River Station explores the lives of those living and working on the remote cattle station of Gibb River in the East Kimberley region from the early 1900s until the 1990s.
 In Light of Shadows. 10 February – 7 July 2018 – Focusing on the Berndt Museum's Asian Collection, In Light of Shadows encourages audiences to question the meaning of light and/or darkness in relation to other cultures and within themselves.
 Milingimbi: A Living Culture. 28 July – 16 December 2017 – The Berndt Museum along with the Milingimbi Aboriginal Art and Cultural Centre and the Janet Holmes a Court Collection present a selection of works from Milingimbi Island in north-east Arnhem Land, Northern Territory. 
 Works of Art from Warburton''. 11 February – 1 July 2017 – The Berndt Museum and Warburton Arts Project bring to Perth a selection of works from the Ngaanyatjarra community's own collection.

Related publications
 Friends of the Berndt Museum of Anthropology (1993). Newsletter University of Western Australia, Friends of the Berndt Museum of Anthropology, Nedlands, W.A
 Berndt Museum of Anthropology 1997, Berndt news : newsletter of the Berndt Museum of Anthropology University of Western Australia, Berndt Museum of Anthropology, Nedlands, W.A

References

External links

Museums in Perth, Western Australia
Anthropology museums
1976 establishments in Australia
Art museums and galleries in Western Australia
University of Western Australia
University museums in Australia